Haitham El-Fazani (born March 14, 1985) is an Egyptian footballer.  He plays as a midfielder for El-Ittihad El-Iskandary of Egypt.

El-Fazani previously played for Al Ahly in the Egyptian Premier League.

References

External links
Profile at Filgoal.com

1985 births
Living people
Al Ittihad Alexandria Club players
Egyptian footballers
Footballers from Cairo
Association football midfielders